Below is a list of French language  exonyms for places in non-French-speaking areas:

Albania

Algeria

Andorra

Argentina

Armenia

Austria

Australia

Azerbaijan

Bangladesh

Belarus

le Bélarus, French name for Belarus created by the Belarus government, isn't used by official French institutions.

Belgium

Bulgaria

Canada

China

Colombia

Croatia

Cyprus

Czech Republic

The equivalent of "Czechia", la Tchéquie, is non-standard in French.

Cuba

Denmark

Dominican Republic

Egypt

El Salvador

Estonia

Ethiopia

Georgia

Germany

Ghana

Greece

Grenada

Hungary

India

Iran

Iraq

Ireland

Israel

Italy

Japan

Jordan

Kenya

Latvia

Lithuania

Libya

Mali

Malta

Myanmar

Netherlands

New Zealand

Nigeria

Norway

Palestine

Philippines

Poland

Portugal

Romania

Russia

Serbia

Slovakia

Slovenia

South Africa

Spain

Switzerland

Sweden

Syria

Turkey

Ukraine

United Kingdom

United States

See also

 List of European exonyms

 
Exonym
Lists of exonyms
Exonym